Mascha Gonska (born 19 November 1952) is a German film actress. She was born in France to Polish parents.

Selected filmography
  (1969), as "Herzblatt"
 The Sex Nest (1970), as Luise Zibell
  (1970), as Gaby
  (1970), as Inge Kainz
 Twenty Girls and the Teachers (1971), as Trixie
 My Father, the Ape and I (1971), as Biggi Hansen
 Und Jimmy ging zum Regenbogen (1971), as Bianca
 Aunt Trude from Buxtehude (1971), as Karin
 The Mad Aunts Strike Out (1971), as Eva Wiedemann
  (1971), as Beatrice
  (1974), as Caroline
 Der kleine Doktor: Die Notbremse (1974, TV series episode), as Jeanette
 The Infernal Trio (1974), as Catherine Schmidt
  (1974, TV miniseries), as Angéline
 Derrick: Tod am Bahngleis (1975, TV series episode), as Hannelore Greiser
 Parapsycho – Spectrum of Fear (1975), as Mascha
 Derrick: Kamillas junger Freund (1975, TV series episode), as Marlies
 Derrick: Alarm auf Revier 12 (1975, TV series episode), as Lona Ross
 Geburtstage: Bitte laut klopfen (1976, TV series episode), as Hanne
 : Das Kind (1976, TV series episode)
 Duett zu dritt (1976)
  (1977), as Eva Hauff
 Derrick: Ein Hinterhalt (1978, TV series episode), as Maria
  (1978), as Agnes
 : Die neue Armut der Familie S. (1978, TV series episode)
 The Old Fox: Pensionstod (1979, TV series episode), as Nana Dorakis
 Wer anderen eine Grube gräbt  (1979, TV anthology film), as Mrs. Mansell
 The American Success Company (1980), as Greta
  (1980, TV series), as Angèle

References

Bibliography
 Goble, Alan. The Complete Index to Literary Sources in Film. Walter de Gruyter, 1999.

External links

1952 births
Living people
German film actresses
German television actresses
20th-century German actresses
German people of Polish descent